John Charles Walker (born July 5, 1952 in Montreal, Quebec) is a Canadian filmmaker and cinematographer.

His film Strand: Under the Dark Cloth won the Genie Award for Best Feature-Length Documentary at the 11th Genie Awards in 1990, and he won Gemini Awards in 1992 for Leningradskaya: The Hand of Stalin and 1996 for Utshimassits: Place of the Boss.

He was also a Genie Award nominee for Best Director at the 10th Genie Awards in 1989 for A Winter Tan, a collective film that he codirected and coproduced with Louise Clark, Jackie Burroughs, Aerlyn Weissman and John Frizzell, and his film The Fairy Faith was a nominee for Best Feature-Length Documentary at the 21st Genie Awards in 2001.

His other films have included Chambers: Tracks and Gestures, Distress Signals, Calling the Shots, Utshimassits: Place of the Boss, God's Dominion: Shepherds to the Flock, Men of the Deeps, Passage, Quebec My Country Mon Pays and Assholes: A Theory. In 2011 he was a participant in the National Parks Project, collaborating with musicians Chad Ross, Sophie Trudeau and Dale Morningstar on a short film about Prince Edward Island National Park.

He was a founding member of the Documentary Organization of Canada.

References

External links

1952 births
Artists from Montreal
Canadian documentary film directors
Canadian cinematographers
Film directors from Montreal
Living people
Directors of Genie and Canadian Screen Award winners for Best Documentary Film
Canadian Film Centre alumni
Film producers from Quebec